In the Soup is a 1936 British comedy film directed by Henry Edwards and starring Ralph Lynn, Judy Gunn, Morton Selten and Nelson Keys.

Synopsis
In a farce, a wealthy couple impersonate their servants to mislead a visitor.

Cast
 Ralph Lynn as Horace
 Judy Gunn as Kitty
 Morton Selten as Abernethy Ruppershaw
 Nelson Keys as Emile Moppert
 Bertha Belmore as Madame Moppert
 Michael Shepley as Paul Hemming
 Olive Melville as Delphine
 Morris Harvey as Bates
 Margaret Yard as Mrs Bates
 Felix Aylmer as Counsel
 Mervyn Johns as Meakin
 Olive Sloane as Defendant

Production
The film was made at Twickenham Studios, based on a play by Ralph Lumley. The film's sets were designed by art director James Carter.

References

Bibliography
 Low, Rachael. Filmmaking in 1930s Britain. George Allen & Unwin, 1985.
 Wood, Linda. British Films, 1927-1939. British Film Institute, 1986.

External links

1936 films
British comedy films
1936 comedy films
Films directed by Henry Edwards
British films based on plays
Films set in London
British black-and-white films
1930s English-language films
1930s British films
English-language comedy films